The Manning Water Tower is a historic structure located in Manning, Iowa, United States. It is significant as a good example of early 20th-century steel elevated water tower design, and its association with Anson Marston and the Chicago Bridge & Iron Company. Marston, who designed the structure, was a professor of engineering at Iowa State College. Manning native Henry J. Brunnier, who studied under Marston, convinced the city council to use one of Marston's designs rather than a less expensive standpipe. He also assisted with this water tower's design, and went on to career as a civil engineer in San Francisco. Also involved in the tower's design was the Chicago Bridge & Iron Company, who built it in 1903. It replaced a pump house with a steam-powered engine and a large water tank that was built near the town's well in 1894. It has a  steel tank, with a cast-iron center pipe, and four steel legs. The superstructure rests on concrete piers with limestone capstones, and the tank is capped with a pagoda-shaped roof. The water tower was listed on the National Register of Historic Places in 2016.

References

Infrastructure completed in 1903
Water towers on the National Register of Historic Places in Iowa
National Register of Historic Places in Carroll County, Iowa
Manning, Iowa